Baotan Township is a township in Luocheng Mulao Autonomous County, Guangxi, China.

Administrative division
As of 2021, the township is divided into one community and seven villages: 
Baotan Community
Lalang
Sibao
Zhuangdong
Xihua
Zhaicen
Wudi
Pingying

History
The region came under the jurisdiction of Sibao Township in 1935 during the Republic of China. 

After establishment of the Communist State, in 1950, it belonged to the Fourth District and soon belonged to the Eighth District in 1953. In 1958, it split into two communes: Sibao People's Commune and Baotan People's Commune, and merged into Huangjin District in 1962. It was incorporated as a township in 1984.

Geography
The township is located at the northwest of Luocheng Mulao Autonomous County. It is bordered to the north by Rongshui Miao Autonomous County and Huanjiang Maonan Autonomous County, to the east by the towns of Huangjin and Long'an, to the south by Qiaoshan Township, and to the west by Naweng Township.

There are two rivers in the township: Baotan River and Sibao River.

Economy
The township's economy is based on nearby mineral resources and agricultural resources. The region abounds with nickel, tin, lead, zinc, antimony, silica, baryte, and crystal stone. The region mainly produce rice and corn. Economic crops are mainly sugarcane, cassava, and rapeseed. Mineral water production is also valuable to the local economy.

Demographics

The 2019 census reported the township had a population of 21,389.

References

Bibliography

 

Divisions of Luocheng Mulao Autonomous County